Harold V. "Shorty" Almquist (January 19, 1904 – April 5, 1994) was an American football, basketball, and baseball player and coach.  He served as the head football coach at Augustana College in Rock Island, Illinois from 1928 to 1940, compiling a record of 65–31–10. Almquist was also the school's head basketball coach in 1931–32 and from 1934 to 1941, tallying a mark of 99–60, and head baseball coach from 1929 to 1942, amassing a record of 23–35; Augustana did not field a baseball team from 1931 to 1937.

Almquist was born on January 19, 1904, in Chisago County, Minnesota.  He died on  April 5, 1994, at Trinity Medical Center, East Campus in Moline, Illinois.

Head coaching record

Football

References

1904 births
1994 deaths
American football quarterbacks
Augustana (Illinois) Vikings baseball coaches
Augustana (Illinois) Vikings football coaches
Augustana (Illinois) Vikings men's basketball coaches
Minnesota Golden Gophers football players
High school football coaches in Illinois